St Catherine's Chapel, located in Lydiate, Merseyside, England, and known locally as Lydiate Abbey, was built c. 1500 for the private worship of the Ireland family, who held the Lydiate lordship from 1410–1673. Its use as a private chapel probably ceased c. 1550, following Henry VIII's Dissolution of the Monasteries, though a small cemetery on the same grounds was still in use until the latter 19th century.

The Chapel survives as a ruin, and is situated on the A5147, adjacent to the Scotch Piper Inn. It is now a Grade II* listed building, and a Scheduled Monument. In recent years, outdoor performances of Shakespeare have been held annually in the Chapel grounds. Markets are also held here in the summer where food and spices, face painting and carnival games are held.

See also
Listed buildings in Lydiate

Gallery

References

External links

Pictures of Lydiate
British History Online - Lydiate
DiscoverThe MerseyForest - Lydiate Loop
Sefton Council - Comedy at the Chapel
Aerospherix Music
TAIT Media Group

Buildings and structures in the Metropolitan Borough of Sefton
Chapels in England
Grade II* listed buildings in Merseyside
Ruins in Merseyside
Scheduled monuments in Merseyside